is a private airfield in the town of Kawajima, Hiki District, and the city of Okegawa, both in Saitama Prefecture, Japan. Another name for it is Okegawa Airfield. The operator is Honda Airways, a subsidiary of Honda Motor Co. Ltd.

Data
The location of the airfield is 35°58'21" north latitude, 139°31'42" east longitude. It operates from 9:00 a.m. to 5:30 p.m. (or sunset).

Prior to World War II, the Imperial Japanese Army developed the site and operated it as Kawataya Airfield. It was established as Honda Airfield in 1964, and received a license for aircraft to operate there in 1967. Helicopter operations commenced in 1975, and in 2003, the Tochigi Prefecture disaster-prevention helicopter began operating there. Saitama Prefecture also operates at Honda.

Honda Airways operates sightseeing, aerial photography and surveying, advertising and publicity flights.

The airfield also serves as a shooting location for television dramas.

External links
Honda Airways Web site (in Japanese)

Airports in Japan
Honda
Transport in Saitama Prefecture
Transport in the Greater Tokyo Area
Buildings and structures in Saitama Prefecture
Kawajima, Saitama
Okegawa, Saitama